Ryan Mmaee A'Nwambeben Kabir (born 1 November 1997) is a professional footballer who plays as a forward for Ferencváros. Born in Belgium, he represents Morocco internationally.

Club career 
Mmaee joined Standard Liège in 2013 from Gent. On 21 May 2015, he made his Belgian Pro League debut with Standard Liège against Gent replacing Mehdi Carcela after 82 minutes in a 2–0 away defeat.

International career
Mmaee is of Cameroonian and Moroccan descent, having a father from Cameroon and a mother from Morocco. As such, he is eligible to represent either Belgium, Cameroon or Morocco at senior level. He made his debut for the senior Morocco national team in a 2–0 win against Sudan.

Personal life
Mmaee's brothers, Samy, Camil and Ryan Mmaee are also a professional footballers. From 2021, the brothers play together for Ferencváros.

Career statistics

Club

Honours
Standard Liège
Belgian Cup: 2015–16

Ferencváros 
Nemzeti Bajnokság I: 2021–22
Magyar Kupa: 2021–22

References

External links
 
 

1997 births
Living people
Moroccan footballers
Belgian footballers
Morocco international footballers
Association football forwards
Belgium youth international footballers
Belgium under-21 international footballers
Black Belgian sportspeople
Standard Liège players
S.K. Beveren players
Aarhus Gymnastikforening players
AEL Limassol players
Ferencvárosi TC footballers
Belgian Pro League players
Danish Superliga players
Cypriot First Division players
Moroccan expatriate footballers
Belgian expatriate footballers
Belgian expatriate sportspeople in Denmark
Expatriate men's footballers in Denmark
Belgian expatriate sportspeople in Cyprus
Moroccan expatriate sportspeople in Cyprus
Expatriate footballers in Cyprus
Moroccan expatriate sportspeople in Hungary
Expatriate footballers in Hungary
Belgian people of Cameroonian descent
Belgian sportspeople of Moroccan descent
Moroccan people of Cameroonian descent
Sportspeople of Cameroonian descent
2021 Africa Cup of Nations players
People from Geraardsbergen
Footballers from East Flanders